Riley Milne is an Australian rules footballer who formally played in the Australian Football League for the Hawthorn Football Club and currently (as of 2015) plays for  in the SANFL.

Milne was selected by the Hawks at pick 16 in the 2008 Rookie draft.

A mobile tall defender who rebounds well and knows how to read the play. Played a key role as a defender in the Murray Bushrangers 2008 TAC Cup premiership team and represented Vic Country in the Under 18s competition.

A tall and lean key defender who is good overhead. He really impressed with his attack on the footy and courage to play in front.

Milne played in the last two games of Hawthorn's 2009 season.

In March 2011, Hawthorn promoted Milne to its senior list. After being delisted at the end of 2011, Milne signed to play for Glenelg in the SANFL for two years.

Statistics

|- style=background:#EAEAEA
| 2009 ||  || 45
| 2 || 0 || 0 || 12 || 12 || 24 || 7 || 0 || 0.0 || 0.0 || 6.0 || 6.0 || 12.0 || 3.5 || 0.0 || 0
|-
| 2010 ||  || 32
| 0 || — || — || — || — || — || — || — || — || — || — || — || — || — || — || 0
|- style=background:#EAEAEA
| 2011 ||  || 32
| 1 || 0 || 0 || 2 || 2 || 4 || 1 || 2 || 0.0 || 0.0 || 2.0 || 2.0 || 4.0 || 1.0 || 2.0 || 0
|- class="sortbottom"
! colspan=3| Career
! 3 !! 0 !! 0 !! 14 !! 14 !! 28 !! 8 !! 2 !! 0.0 !! 0.0 !! 4.7 !! 4.7 !! 9.3 !! 2.7 !! 0.7 !! 0
|}

References

External links

1990 births
Living people
Australian rules footballers from Victoria (Australia)
Hawthorn Football Club players
Box Hill Football Club players
Murray Bushrangers players
Mooroopna Football Club players
Glenelg Football Club players
West Adelaide Football Club players